Maureen Lally-Green is an American lawyer in the state of Pennsylvania.  She served as a judge on the Pennsylvania Superior Court.

Personal
Lally-Green was born in Sharpsville, Mercer County, in 1949.  She graduated from Duquesne University with a B.S. in 1971 and its School of Law in 1974.

Lally-Green practiced law in a private law firm in Pittsburgh. She later served as counsel to Commodity Futures Trading Commission in Washington, D.C., as counsel to the former Westinghouse Electric Corporation, and as a consultant to Justices of the Pennsylvania Supreme Court.

Judicial career
In 1998, Lally-Green was appointed by Governor Tom Ridge to the Superior Court of Pennsylvania and confirmed by the State Senate.  The next year, Judge Lally-Green was elected for a full ten-year term.

Lally-Green ran for a seat on the Pennsylvania Supreme Court in 2007.  During the campaign, a Virginia organization called the Center for Individual Freedom ran over $1.2 million worth of ads on her behalf.  The organization had not registered with the state nor did it file campaign reports.  The campaign led to efforts by state officials to determine the origin of the cash.  However, the source was never determined.

Lally-Green finished third in the race behind Seamus McCaffery and Debra Todd, two colleagues on the Superior Court.

References

External links
Lally green Biography at Pennsylvania Superior Court

1949 births
Living people
Duquesne University alumni
People from Mercer County, Pennsylvania
Lawyers from Pittsburgh
Duquesne University faculty
Women in Pennsylvania politics
American women judges
Judges of the Superior Court of Pennsylvania
Commodity Futures Trading Commission personnel
American women academics